Josefina Zoraida Vázquez is a noted Mexican historian, considered the Mexican expert on the Mexican–American War.

Early life
Vázquez is the daughter of Modesto Vázquez. She was raised in Mexico City, where she attended public schools. Her education was conducted entirely in Spanish; she did not study either English or French in school, as her counterparts in private schools did. As a teenager, she worked part-time for her father, clerking in his bookstore and correcting gallery proofs for books he was editing. After graduating from high school, Vázquez entered the National Autonomous University of Mexico (UNAM), studying philosophy and letters. She received her degree in 1955.

Although Vázquez says she originally wanted to be a scientist, her father influenced her love of history.  She was also inspired by historian Edmundo O'Gorman and his teachings on the roles of history and historians.

In 1958, Vázquez was awarded a Ph.D. in American history form the Central University of Madrid.  She received a degree in history from Harvard University in 1962, and a Ph.D. in history from UNAM in 1968.

Career
Vázquez is a noted historian of Mexican history, and is considered the Mexican expert on the Mexican–American War. Her work has also included scholarly histories of the history of national education in Mexico, and the first few decades of Mexican independence (1821–1845). She has also written several official history textbooks used in schools throughout the country.

Vázquez has served as a historical adviser to numerous documentaries, including one produced by KERA-TV.

A member of the Congress of Mexican Historians from Mexico, the United States, and Canada, Vázquez organized the group's convention in 1977 and served as president in 2003. She was honored by the Fondo de Cultura Economica in 2012.

Bibliography
 The United States and Mexico (1982) with Lorenzo Meyer
 Interpretaciones del siglo XVIII mexicano: el impacto de las reformas borbónicas (1992)
 México al tiempo de su guerra con Estados Unidos, 1846-1848 (1997)
 México y el mundo. Historia de sus relaciones exteriores dos tomos (2000)
 Tratados de México: soberanía y territorio, 1821-1910 (2000)
 El establecimiento del federalismo en México, 1821-1827 (2003)
 Juárez el republicano (2005)

References

Sources

 

Living people
1932 births
Historians of the Texas Revolution
Mexican women historians
National Autonomous University of Mexico alumni
20th-century Mexican historians
21st-century Mexican historians